The Boston mayoral election of 1876 saw the election of Frederick O. Prince.

Results

See also
List of mayors of Boston, Massachusetts

References

Mayoral elections in Boston
Boston
Boston mayoral
19th century in Boston